Paul Eichelmann (11 October 1879 – 9 December 1938) was a German international footballer.

References

1879 births
1938 deaths
BFC Germania 1888 players
Association football goalkeepers
German footballers
Germany international footballers